Richard Erwin Cleve is a Canadian professor of computer science at the David R. Cheriton School of Computer Science at the University of Waterloo, where he holds the Institute for Quantum Computing Chair in quantum computing, and an associate member of the Perimeter Institute for Theoretical Physics.

Education
He obtained his BMath and MMath from the University of Waterloo, and his Ph.D. in 1989 at the University of Toronto under the supervision of Charles Rackoff.

Research
He was the recipient of the 2008 CAP-CRM Prize in Theoretical and Mathematical Physics, awarded for "fundamental results in quantum information theory, including the structure of quantum algorithms and the foundations of quantum communication complexity." He has authored several highly cited papers in quantum information, and is one of the creators of the field of quantum communication complexity. He is also one of the founding managing editors of the journal Quantum Information & Computation, a founding fellow of the Quantum Information Processing program at the Canadian Institute for Advanced Research, and a Team Leader at QuantumWorks.

References

Year of birth missing (living people)
Living people
Academic staff of the University of Waterloo
University of Waterloo alumni
Theoretical computer scientists
University of Toronto alumni
Canadian computer scientists
Quantum information scientists